Hidulf (died 707) was an abbot, founder of Moyenmoutier Abbey, and reputed bishop of Trier. He may have been born in Regensburg.

A contemporary view is that he was not a diocesan bishop, nor abbot of Saint-Dié Abbey in France.  
 
He is a Catholic and Orthodox saint. His feast day is 11 July.

See also
 Erhard of Regensburg
 Odile of Alsace

Notes

References

707 deaths
8th-century Christian saints
Year of birth unknown
Colombanian saints